The Western Kentucky is a large coal field located in the east of the United States in Kentucky. Western Kentucky represents one of the largest coal reserve in the United States having estimated reserves of 35.67 billion tonnes of coal.

References 

Coal in the United States